Chain Reaction: Yokohama Concert, Vol. 2 is a live album by jazz trombonist J. J. Johnson and trumpeter Nat Adderley recorded in 1977 for the Pablo Live label and originally released as a CD in 2002.

Reception

The Allmusic review by Rick Anderson stated "It is not a perfect album by any means, but it does offer music of significant value. ...Not essential, but far from worthless".

Track listing
 "Blue 'n' Boogie" (Dizzy Gillespie, Frank Paparelli) - 9:01
 "Modaji" (Dave Grusin) - 5:55
 "Song from M*A*S*H (Suicide Is Painless)" (Johnny Mandel, Robert Altman) - 5:06 	
 "Colors" (Billy Childs) - 4:48
 "Chain Reaction" (Joe Sample) - 4:02
 "Mr. Clean" (Weldon Irvine) - 7:23 	
 "Walkin'" (Richard Carpenter) - 7:58
 "Mohawk" (J. J. Johnson) - 6:34
Recorded in Tokyo on April 16, 1977 (tracks 4-8) and Yokohama on April 20, 1977 (tracks 1-3)

Personnel 
J. J. Johnson - trombone, arranger
Nat Adderley - trumpet
Billy Childs - piano
Tony Dumas - bass
Kevin Johnson - drums

References 

2002 live albums
Pablo Records live albums
J. J. Johnson live albums
Nat Adderley live albums